The 29th European Women's Artistic Gymnastics Championships were held from 9 May to 13 May 2012 in Brussels.

Timetable

Medalists

Detail results

Seniors

Team

Vault 
Oldest and youngest competitors

Uneven Bars 

Oldest and youngest competitors

Balance Beam 

Oldest and youngest competitors

Floor 

Oldest and youngest competitors

Juniors

Team

All-Around

Vault 

Oldest and youngest competitors

Uneven Bars

Balance Beam 

Oldest and youngest competitors

Floor 
Oldest and youngest competitors

Medal Count

Combined

Seniors

Juniors

Oldest and youngest competitors

External links
 

2012
European Women's Artistic Gymnastics Championships
2012 in European sport
International gymnastics competitions hosted by Belgium
2012 in Belgian sport